The Avenues Mall is the largest shopping mall in Kuwait. The mall is located in the Rai area extending from Fifth Ring Road from the south and Al Ghazali Highway from the east. It opened in April 2007, under the patronage of the Emir of Kuwait Sheikh Sabah Al Ahmed Al Sabah. It was the winner of the ICSC Gold Award for “Best Shopping Center 2013” under the Expansion and Design Category in the Middle East & North Africa. It features more than 1,100 stores and parking for 13,000 cars.

Design 

The shopping mall has four distinct phases: Phase I completed in December 2006, Phase IIA in May 2008, Phase IIB in August 2009, Phase III in November 2013 and Phase IV in March 2018. Across a span of twelve years, The Avenues has spent a total of US$3,061,500,000 in building and construction. The Avenues is home to a number of districts: 1st Avenue, 2nd Avenue, Grand Avenue, Prestige, The Mall, SOKU, The Souk, The Arcades, The Cinema, The Gardens, Electra and Grand Plaza, the latter five opening as a part of the new extension of Phase IV.

The mall is built under and managed by Mabanee Company K.P.S.C., Gensler. and Pace.

Grand Avenue 

The Grand Avenue is designed to feel like an outdoor space. The boulevard is covered with a transparent roof structure reinforcing and enhancing the outdoor atmosphere. This district was a part of the expansion of Phase III, opening to the public with major designer brands: Gucci, Dior, Louis Vuitton, Fendi, etc. in the Prestige district. Alongside the new openings of restaurants including Shake Shack, Cheesecake Factory, IHOP, Olive Garden and more. The street is paved in stone along a path of trees on either side.

Grand Avenue also opened KidZania, a corporation that installs a child-sized model of a real city and gives children the opportunity to act as adults. The franchise opened in Kuwait in June '2013.

Grand Plaza 
The Grand Plaza is the pinnacle of The Avenues development. This is a 640m promenade down Grand Avenue. Located at the end of Grand Avenue, Grand Plaza takes inspiration from civic squares around the world, creating a new meeting place and events space for The Avenues. There is a variety of trees lined on either side of the promenade, with available seating and gathering spaces for shows, markets and performances. The Grand Plaza was a part of the latest installment of Phase IV.

Current Projects 

The most recent completion The Avenues held was the construction of Phase IV. The inclusion of numerous new districts, "the mall is expected to employ 30,000 people, some of which will work on the facility's 300 new stores".

A four star and five star hotel are currently in construction, with TradeArabia, an Arabian business news information stating, "Waldorf Astoria, Hilton’s smart luxury hotel brand, and mid-scale Hilton Garden Inn open their doors to guests in early 2019 at the mall". Waldorf Astoria is open in door to guests in August 2022. Mohammad Alshaya, chairman of Mabanee, said: “In planning the fourth phase of the expansion of this immense project, one of the most exciting additions, we are providing the ability for visitors to stay inside Avenues itself".

Influences 
The Avenues was primarily created under the influence of the climate and region Kuwait is located in. Basing the architecture on the natural forms of the desert sand dune, rock formation and the sky, the neutral colors of the interior, and the open window ceilings brings The Avenues Concept together. Among each respective district there is a particular influence behind it.

Grand Avenue 
The influence behind the Grand Avenue was to make the mall feel like it's a grand shopping boulevard, gathering European and American influence to construct the district, for example the Champs-Élysées in Paris, France, or Rodeo Drive in Los Angeles, California. 12

Electra 
The influence from Hong Kong's Kowloon, the district is heavily influenced by the bright lights and overall technology found in Asia. This is where digital retail is found. The concept was to make the shoppers feel as if they were walking down Times Square in New York City, or Tokyo's Ginza district. There will always be something fresh on display in this district, making every visit special and unique.

The Souk (Marketplace) 
Heavily influenced by the country the mall is located, this district mirrors the traditional marketplace the Kuwaitis of the past used. This district is an interpretation of this region's traditional retail architecture, including narrow streets and a color scheme to match that of the desert. Involving traditional cafes and classic Arabic cuisines, this area encompasses the former Kuwait.

The Forum 
The completely white modern space is influenced by the major cities in the world: Los Angeles, Milan, London. Offering shoppers a contemporary metropolitan shopping experience.

SoKu 
SoKu (an acronym for South of Kuwait) finds inspiration from New York's bohemian SoHo district, and is reminiscent of “edgy” city architecture, as well as numerous cafes and bistros, all designed to capture the attention of Kuwait's younger, trendier consumers.

Restaurants and Stores 
There are many international and national-based restaurants and stores found in the avenues. Since Kuwait is heavily influenced by the British lifestyle, there are shops that has branched from England, to Kuwait. Shops such as Charlotte Tilbury, Jack Wills, and Marks and Spencer. Along with British brands, many American brand names can also be found in the mall: Forever 21, Pottery Barn, Tiffany & Co. and Borders Stationery and Toys Shop.

The Avenues also hosts French, Dutch, Turkish, Swiss and Arabic restaurants and stores, making The Avenues the most internationally diverse widespread area in Kuwait.

Districts

1st Avenue 
The 1st Avenue district covers a spacious area that includes over 200 stores, restaurants, and cafes and 11 Cinescape movie theatres. It encompasses a home furnishing zone, including international stores, some making their first debut in Kuwait and others launching their stores exclusively in The Avenues. It is also the first of the Avenues districts.

2nd Avenue 
The 2nd Avenue contains a unique dining atmosphere that includes both locally and internationally renowned restaurants and cafés. The district has an outdoor feel with a spacious two-floor design under a glass ceiling. The Food World, located on the 2nd Floor, is also another example of the Avenues' international and local franchises that are together centered around the fulfillment of a casual and fast-food dining experience.

The Prestige 
The Prestige is considered the most luxurious of all the districts in the Avenues. The Prestige district offers a world-class luxury shopping experience to its shoppers and is home to premium restaurants and cafes that cater to international culinary essence and flavors of high-end gourmet. To give the district a further luxurious experience it is also home to the five-star hotel Waldorf Astoria, which is considered one of the most luxurious hotels in the world.

See also
The Avenues Bahrain

References

Shopping malls in Kuwait
Tourist attractions in Kuwait
Shopping malls established in 2007
2007 establishments in Kuwait